The Asheville–Weaverville Speedway near Weaverville, North Carolina was considered to be the site for old-school NASCAR races in both the Grand National and Winston Cup Series eras. From 1951 to 1969, the race course offered some wins from drivers like Richard Petty, Bob Flock, Fonty Flock, Lee Petty, Rex White, and Fireball Roberts. As a dirt oval track, the speedway helped served its purpose during the dirt-dominated formative years of NASCAR's premier series.  The track was later paved over.  Other NASCAR legends like Banjo Matthews, Ralph Earnhardt, Junior Johnson, and Cotton Owens had made notable appearances here.

The track was closed from the 1970s to racing, until North Buncombe High School was built on the property of the former track. In the 1970s and 1980s the track was used as softball fields and sports practice fields. The track itself had been disabled by first placing earthen barriers on opposite sides of the track, and later, concrete barriers at 8 locations around the track.

An anti-noise ordinance was used to shut down the track after years of racing; this fight was staged as early as the 1970 racing season when a group of citizens petitioned their city council to shut down the track. 75% of people who read the Asheville Citizen wanted that track to be closed in a poll done in the summer of 1987.  However, by that time, the track had already been physically disabled for racing purposes. Urbanization and progress forced the property to be closed, demolished, and re-zoned for educational purposes.

The property is now occupied by North Buncombe High School with 1,117 students.

Winners of the circuit
Winners of the circuit during the Grand National Series.

New Asheville Speedway
The Asheville-Weaverville Speedway is not to be confused with the "New Asheville Speedway", which was a  oval circuit located on Amboy Road in Asheville, about 12 miles south of the Asheville-Weaverville Speedway. This track was closed after the track owners sold the track in 1998 to RiverLink, an organization that promoted making the French Broad River area of Asheville a public park. New Asheville became Carrier Park, with its racetrack becoming a banked concrete bicycle track.

References

External links
 Track race results at Racing Reference

Sports venues completed in 1951
1987 disestablishments in North Carolina
Buildings and structures in Buncombe County, North Carolina
Motorsport venues in North Carolina
NASCAR tracks
1951 establishments in North Carolina
Defunct motorsport venues in the United States